2V-ALK (pronounced "walk") is the second studio album by Hiroyuki Sawano's vocal project SawanoHiroyuki[nZk]. It was released on September 20, 2017 through the Sony Music label SACRA MUSIC. 2V-ALK was proceeded by the singles "Into the Sky", "CRYst-Alise", "e of s", "gravityWall" and "sh0ut".

The album charted at #3 in the daily ranks for the first week. It charted for 8 weeks in the Oricon charts.

Background
"Into the Sky" was used in the anime series Mobile Suit Gundam Unicorn RE:0096 as the opening theme, while "Next 2 U -eUC-" was used as the first ending theme.

"CRYst-Alise" was used as the main theme for the mobile game VALHAITRISING.

"e of s" was used as the opening theme for the mobile game Soul Reverse Zero, while "ninelie <cry-v>" was used as the ending theme for the first Kabaneri of the Iron Fortress compilation film.

"gravityWall" was used as the first opening theme for the anime television series Re:Creators, while "sh0ut" was used as the second opening theme.

"Amazing Trees" was used as the opening theme for the PS4 game Border Break.

Track listing

Credits 
Adapted from Booklet.
Production
Hiroyuki Sawano – arranger, producer, programming
Yasushi Horiguchi – executive producer
Daisuke Katsurada – executive producer
Mitsunori Aizawa – recording, mixing engineer & Pro Tools operator
Kozo Miyamoto – assistant engineer
Hideto Matsumoto – assistant engineer
Masakatsu Mizuno – assistant engineer
Kosuke Abe – assistant engineer
Eriko Iijima – assistant engineer
Yosuke Maeda – assistant engineer
Keisuke Narita – assistant engineer
Yota Ishizuka – assistant engineer
Kei Izawa – assistant engineer
Kazuaki Takanishi – assistant engineer
Erika Shimada – assistant engineer
Yuji Chinone – mastering
Ryotaro Kawashima – art direction & design
Kiyoaki Sasahara – photographer
Aya Murakami – hair & make-up
Yuko Mori – products coordination
Toru Takeuchi – a&r
Anna Komatsuzaki – a&r
SME Records Promotion Room – media promotion
Yukihiro Sato – sales promotion
Kei Yamamoto – digital promotion
Kazuto Fushimi – digital promotion
Keiichi Tonomura – superviseVocals
Aimer – vocals (track 8)
Eliana Silva – vocals (track 17)
Gemie – vocals (tracks 3, 5, 9, 14)
mizuki – vocals, background vocals (tracks 4, 10)
naNami – vocals (track 13)
Tielle – vocals (tracks 2, 3, 6, 9, 12, 15), background vocals (track 6)
Yosh Morita – vocals (tracks 7, 11)
Hiroyuki Sawano – background vocals (tracks 4, 6, 10, 17)
Anna Komatsuzaki – background vocals (tracks 6, 10)
Akiko Shimodoi – background vocals (tracks 4, 17)
cAnON. – background vocals (tracks 10, 17)
Hajime – background vocals (tracks 4, 6, 10, 17)
Kohta Yamamoto – background vocals (track 4)
Yasushi "yassh!!" Horiguchi – background vocals (tracks 4, 17)
Instruments
Harutoshi Ito – cello (tracks 1, 12, 17), guitar (tracks 1, 6-8, 10-13, 15, 17)
Hiroyuki Sawano – piano (tracks 1, 2, 3, 4, 6-13, 15, 16, 17), keyboards (tracks 2-14, 15, 17), all other instruments (all tracks)
Hiroshi Iimuro – guitar (tracks 2-4, 9, 13)
Masashi Tsubakimoto – guitar (tracks 1, 5, 14)
Toshino Tanabe – bass (tracks 1-4, 6-13, 15)
Yu "masshoi" Yamauchi – drums (tracks 1-4, 6-10, 12-13, 15)

References

2017 albums
Hiroyuki Sawano albums